Jaranwala–Nankana Road (Punjabi), also known locally as Nankana Road is a provincially maintained road in Punjab Pakistan that extends from Jaranwala to Nankana.

References

Roads in Punjab, Pakistan
Transport in Faisalabad District
Streets in Faisalabad